The Union des forces progressistes fielded seventy-four candidates in the 2003 Quebec provincial election, none of whom were elected. Information about these candidates may be found on this page.

Candidates
(n.c.: no candidate)

References

See also
For one of the predecessor parties: :Category:New Democratic Party of Quebec candidates in Quebec provincial elections
For the successor party: :Category:Québec solidaire candidates in Quebec provincial elections

Candidates in Quebec provincial elections
2003 election